Water Street is one of the 15 constituencies of the Central and Western District Council in Hong Kong. The seat elects one member of the council every four years.

The constituency loosely covers the area around the Water Street in Sai Ying Pun with estimated population of 14,983.

Councillors represented

Election results

2010s

2000s

1990s

Notes

Citations

References
2011 District Council Election Results (Central & Western)
2007 District Council Election Results (Central & Western)
2003 District Council Election Results (Central & Western)
1999 District Council Election Results (Central & Western)
 

Constituencies of Hong Kong
1994 in Hong Kong
1999 in Hong Kong
2003 in Hong Kong
2007 in Hong Kong
2011 in Hong Kong
Constituencies of Central and Western District Council
1994 establishments in Hong Kong
Constituencies established in 1994
Sai Ying Pun